Eklipse Sports Radio  was a Scottish-owned independent local radio station. It was based in Kinning Park on the Southside of Glasgow and broadcast to Fife, and Central Scotland. All programming was produced in Glasgow.

The station ceased broadcasting on 29 February 2016 after the owners withdrew their financial support.

History 

The station was mooted in the Summer of 2013 when capacity became available on the Central Scotland multiplex and a five-year transmission contract was signed with Switch Scotland. The station's OFCOM broadcast licence was granted in July 2013 with a licensed format of sports news, talk and Classic rock music to a potential 2.7 million adults in the station's TSA.

The company raised £40,000 in capital under the UK government's Seed Enterprise Investment Scheme, although launch was delayed by the sudden death of a major investor in November 2013. In February 2014 the station moved into new studio premises in Admiral St in the Kinning Park area of Glasgow. The founding Station Director was Spencer Pryor. He sold his entire shareholding to a consortium of local businessmen and left the station in January 2015.

At the time of its closure, presenters included George Aitchison, a former Qfm and Your Radio presenter on Breakfast. Bill Young the former Programme Controller at Belfast's CityBeat hosted the station's flagship phone-in programme along with co-hosts ex Rangers, Heart of Midlothian and Ayr United defender Hugh Burns on Mondays, Thursdays and Fridays. The other regular co-hosts were Ally Graham former Falkirk and Raith Rovers striker was also a regular pundit.

The station negotiated the rights to cover Scottish Junior Football for the 2014/15 season including commentaries and match reports.

The station subscribed to RAJAR from Q3 2014 and was a member of RadioCentre. The station's national advertising sales were handled by First Radio Sales in London.

Presenters 
George Aitchison (Weekday breakfast) (BEST)
Ian Martin (Weekday mid-mornings)
Alex Horsburgh (Weekday afternoons)
Bill Young (Weekday football phone-in)
Stephen Quinn (Weekday Evenings)
Dave Mac (Weekend Breakfast)
Ian Oliphant (Weekend mornings)
Andy Alston (F1 Review Show)
Andy Coyle (Sunday afternoon)

Former Presenters 
Nick Mills
Peter Greenwood
Catt Weir
Steve Delahaye
Chris Kane
Rod Johnston
Chris Duke
Scott Summers
Dave Knight

References

External links 
 

Radio stations in Glasgow
Modern rock radio stations
Digital-only radio stations
Radio stations established in 2013
Radio stations disestablished in 2016
2013 establishments in Scotland
2016 disestablishments in Scotland